Hoopfest is an annual outdoor 3-on-3 basketball tournament held in Downtown Spokane, Washington.

It is the largest event of its kind in the world. In 2011 the event drew 27,876 players on 7,046 teams. It began in 1989 with 2,009 players on 512 teams, and has grown to over 6,700 participant teams. It is estimated that around 175,000 fans visited the event in both 2010 and 2011 (and likely for many years before, although estimates had not been observed for previous years), meaning that the total number of people at Hoopfest could be measured at around 200,000 including players, fans, and volunteers. This number nearly equals Spokane's 2010 Census population of 208,000.

Hoopfest is not just a basketball event, as there is often live music being played in Riverfront Park, along with merchandisers and various food tents. A very wide range of players are allowed to play, as the only requirement is that players must be entering at least the third grade in the fall following Hoopfest. A few men in their seventies have participated in Hoopfest. Matching uniforms are very common among the male and female high school divisions, and some teams have taken it as far as to wear Halloween costumes.

Basic information

Hoopfest is held annually on the final weekend of June, beginning at 8:00 AM Saturday and coming to a close around 5:00 PM on Sunday, with the Men's Elite championship being broadcast regionally on KHQ Channel 6 and SWX Channel 6-2. In 2010, there were 428 courts spread throughout Downtown Spokane, resulting in over 40 city blocks being inaccessible to vehicles. This is overly compensated for by the estimated $30 million that Hoopfest brings to Spokane, according to a survey conducted in 2006. With players coming to play from 42 states in 2010, the hotels and businesses around downtown Spokane flourish on Hoopfest weekend.

Format
Hoopfest features a basic 16-team, double-elimination bracket, which is played entirely on one court location (except in elite divisions, which start on street courts and eventually move to Nike Center Court). This means that the number of brackets is almost exactly equal to the number of courts. Due to the possibility of the number of teams in a division not being divisible by 16, there are sometimes brackets featuring more or less than 16 teams, but the double elimination theme remains constant. Teams are guaranteed 3 games, as teams that lose their first two games are put into a consolation bracket. The winner of the consolation bracket is the 13th place team in the bracket, and is awarded a "13th Place" t-shirt, which always has "Loser Kings" hidden subtly in the design (it used to be obvious, but complaining parents caused a change) in the form of a connect-the-dots puzzle. The two teams that make the championship round are awarded with "Finalist" t-shirts.

Divisions 
Teams are divided into separate divisions based on their age, playing experience (according to the players themselves), height, gender, and competitiveness.

Divisions:
 Standard (The vast majority of teams qualify here)
 Adult
 High School (oldest player entering grade 9-12)
 Youth (oldest player entering grade 3-8)
For each standard level, there is the option of team gender (M, F, Co-Ed) and competitiveness level (Recreational or Competitive).
 3BA Adult Elite
Men's Over 6 foot
Men's under 6 foot
Women's
Co-Ed

 3BA High School Varsity
Men's
Women's

 3BA Freshman Elite
Men's
Women's

 Family
 Special Olympics
 Unified
 Wheelchair

Rules
For the complete list of Hoopfest Rules and Regulations, click here.

 A basket made from inside the 2-point arc is worth one point, shots made from outside are worth two points.
 Each team may have a maximum of four players.
 Players call their own fouls, unless in a Youth or Elite division.  Youth and Elite divisions are officiated by the court monitors.
 No stalling is allowed.
 The 2-point line is 19 feet for adult divisions, which is 6 inches shorter than the regulation distance for high school.
 Games are won by the first team to score 20 points, or by the team that leads after 25 minutes.
 In any dead ball situation, the ball is to be "checked" in from the top of the key.  The offensive team MUST pass the ball to begin their possession, and that pass must be uncontested by the defense as long as it is above the extended free throw line.

References

External links

Spokane, Washington
Culture of Spokane, Washington
Sports in Spokane, Washington
3x3 basketball competitions in the United States